Philodinidae is a family of rotifers belonging to the order Bdelloidea.

Genera
Genera:
 Anomopus Piovanelli, 1903
 Callidina Ehrenberg, 1830
 Ceratotrocha Bryce, 1910
 Didymodactylos Milne, 1916
 Dissotrocha Bryce, 1910
 Embata Bryce, 1910
 Esechielina Bory de St.Vincent, 1827
 Macrotrachela Milne, 1886
 Mniobia Bryce, 1910
 Philodina Ehrenberg, 1830
 Pleuretra Bryce, 1910
 Pseudoembata Wycliffe & Michael, 1968
 Rotaria Scopoli, 1777
 Zelinkiella Harring, 1913

References

Bdelloidea
Rotifer families